Thana Theke Aschi  is a 2010 Bengali film directed by Saran Dutta. It is an adaptation of the English play An Inspector Calls. The thriller film was rated 3.5 stars in its review by the Times of India. A mystery movie of the same name was made in 1965 starring Uttam Kumar and Madhabi Mukherjee.

Plot
The story revolves around a cop, named Tinkori Haldar who pays a visit to a rich and well known businessman of the town, Amarnath Mullick . After the engagement party between his daughter Rinita and Rajat, and when everyone has left Tinkori Haldar visits and informs them that a woman named Sandhya Mondal has committed suicide in the Goabagan Bustee. Everyone looks astonished and tells they have nothing to do with the case, because they are fully unaware about her. But Haldar tells them she has left behind a diary where all their names (Mr Mullick, his wife, his son Arin, his daughter Rinita and Rajat) are mentioned. Now it is revealed that all of them knew her by different names and had done injustice to her in some way or the other and the mystery starts unfolding. They all tell their own stories of how they had come across Sandhya and had done injustice to her that probably made her commit suicide. After Tinkari Haldar leaves, it is discovered that there is nothing written in the diary and no cop by the name of Tinakari Haldar is there at Padmapukur Thana. However, they soon receive a call from the local thana stating that a woman named Sandhya Mondal had indeed committed suicide at Goabagan Bustee and their names had been found in her diary, and a cop is on his way to interrogate them. All of them wonder then who is actually Tinkori Haldar! and according to Arin, who actually loved her once thinks it is their conscience that had paid them a visit to unfold their true faces and realities of life.

Cast 
 Parambrata Chattopadhyay 
 Rudranil Ghosh
 Dulal Lahiri as Amarnath Mullick
 Sabyasachi Chakraborty
 Paoli Dam as Sandhya Mondal
 Alakananda Ray
 Shrabonti Malakar
 Faiman

Music

References 

Films set in Kolkata
Bengali-language Indian films
Indian detective films
2010s Bengali-language films
Films scored by Jeet Ganguly